Sambuci is a  (municipality) in the Metropolitan City of Rome in the Italian region of Latium, located about  east of Rome.

References

Cities and towns in Lazio